Warren Lewis (1895–1973) was an Irish historian and British Army officer, and the brother of author C.S. Lewis

Warren Lewis may also refer to:

Warren Lewis (soccer, born 1971), former South African association football player
Warren Lewis (screenwriter), American film producer and screenwriter
Warren Harmon Lewis (1870–1964), American biologist
Warren K. Lewis (1882–1975), American chemical engineer
Warren Lewis (Australian footballer) (1923–1988), Australian rules footballer
Warren Lewis (ice hockey), American ice hockey player